Aleph Samach was a junior honor society at Cornell University that existed from 1893 until 1981. It was founded on four pillars: leadership, loyalty, service, and honor. Unlike most collegiate secret societies, which have primarily senior membership, Aleph Samach was composed mostly of juniors. While senior members played an advisory role within the society, Aleph Samach's primary goal was "to promote the greater good of the Cornell community by connecting junior leaders, cultivating their leadership skills and developing their commitment to campus service."

History
Aleph Samach (sometimes spelled Aleph Samech) was founded in 1893 at Cornell University as an honorary society for men of the junior class. Aleph Samach can document its operational status as late as AY 1964-1965 and AY 1978-79 and AY 1980–81.

Like many societies at Cornell, it sought to recognize those men of distinct character who were emerging leaders on campus. The society remained strong in its early decades and was an influential organization on campus. Along with some of the other class societies, most notably Quill and Dagger and Sphinx Head, it promoted campus-wide agendas; some of the more notable results being the creation of what would become Slope Day. By 1896, The New York Times listed Aleph Samach as the junior class society at Cornell, alongside the Chancery (senior law), Sphinx Head (senior), Quill and Dagger (senior), and Theta Nu Epsilon (sophomore) societies. The turn of the century saw Aleph Samach integretated into the senior honorary societies system of campus-wide governance. Aleph Samach was a stepping stone to Sphinx Head and Quill and Dagger. The sophomore society, Theta Nu Epsilon, was a debauched institution. This led one Cornell fraternity, Phi Kappa Psi, to bar membership in Theta Nu Epsilon. Aleph Samach, Sphinx Head, and Quill and Dagger, however, emerged in the first decade of the 20th century as the lead institutions of Cornell undergraduate governance. By 1917, the sophomore class was without an honorary society following the collapse of Theta Nu Epsilon's successor, Dunstan. And the senior honorary societies, formerly the apex of Cornell student governance, had been dispossessed of their oligarchy by the Student Council. But Aleph Samach was still the uncontested honorary society of the junior class. After the creation of a unified Student Council following the First World War, the honorary societies nonetheless remained an active force. Aleph Samach joined with the council, Sphinx Head, and Quill and Dagger in fall 1920 to petition the Cornell Board of Trustees to elevate the popular Acting President to the position of president until such time as the university chose a new head. In 1939, Aleph Samach was listed as a junior class co-honorary society with Cornell's Red Key Society.

Symbols and traditions 
"Aleph" and "Samach" are letters of the Hebrew language. Most of the rituals of Aleph Samach are secret.

Membership
Members are tapped for membership in Aleph Samach in the spring of their sophomore year or fall of their junior year. Selection is based on participation in extra-curricular activities. Aleph Samach was an all-male institution. Cornell had a separate but equal honorary society for junior women, Raven and Serpent. During the "Club War" of 1913–1914, Aleph Samach allied itself with The Cornell Daily Sun, Sphinx Head and Quill and Dagger in an effort to suppress the growing influence of the following "social clubs" or drinking societies at Cornell: Majura, Beth l'Amed, Kappa Beta Phi, Bench and Board, Gemel Kharm, Yonan, Mermaid, Krug and Tafel, and the Climax. The three honorary societies and the Sun would not allow any member of the drinking societies to be tapped into their organizations. During the fall of 1913, Quill and Dagger took the largest hit in membership, as many members of the Class of 1914 were members of the drinking societies.

Notable Aleph Samach members
 Samuel R. Berger
 Stanley Chess
 Gib Cool
 Henry Livingston French
 Sam Roberts
 John L. Senior
 Willard Straight
 Kurt Vonnegut Jr.
 E. B. White

See also
Collegiate secret societies in North America

References

Cornell University
1893 establishments in New York (state)
Collegiate secret societies
Student societies in the United States
Student organizations established in 1893